Glons is a village of Wallonia and a district of the municipality of Bassenge, located in the province of Liège, Belgium.

Glons is a significant site in that it is the home of the NATO Programming Centre.

References 

Bassenge
Former municipalities of Liège Province